Jody Williams (born 1950) is an American teacher and aid worker who received the 1997 Nobel Peace Prize

Jody Williams may also refer to:

Jody Williams (Afrikaans singer) (born 1990), South African Pop/R&B singer better known as Jody 
Jody Williams (artist) (born 1956), American artist
Jody Williams (blues musician) (1935–2018), American blues guitarist and singer
Jody Williams (chef) (born 1963), American chef and television personality

See also
Jodie Williams (born 1993), British sprinter